Mukim Berakas 'A' is a mukim in Brunei-Muara District, Brunei. The population was 27,223 in 2016.

Background 
The mukim and Mukim Berakas 'B' were originally one mukim by the name 'Mukim Berakas' before being split into the current divisions in 1996.

Geography 
The mukim borders the South China Sea to the north, Mukim Mentiri and Mukim Berakas 'B' to the east, Mukim Kianggeh to the south, Mukim Gadong 'B' to the south-west and Mukim Gadong 'A' to the west.

Demographics 
As of 2016 census, the population of Mukim Berakas 'A' comprised 14,193 males and 13,030 females. The mukim had 5,186 households occupying 5,071 dwellings. The entire population lived in urban areas.

Settlements 
Mukim Berakas 'A' encompasses the following populated settlements:

 Kampong Anggerek Desa
 Kampong Burong Pingai Berakas
 Kampong Jaya Bakti
 Kampong Jaya Setia
 Kampong Lambak
 Kampong Lambak Kiri
 Kampong Orang Kaya Besar Imas
 Kampong Pancha Delima
 Kampong Pengiran Siraja Muda Delima Satu
 Kampong Pulaie
 Kampong Serusop
 Kampong Terunjing
  ('Government Departments and Housing Area')
  ('Berakas Camp')

See also 
 Mukim Berakas 'B'

References 

Berakas 'A'
Brunei-Muara District